The American Cup, formerly known as the AT&T American Cup through a sponsorship arrangement that ended in 2018, was an elite senior level international gymnastics competition that had been held in the United States from 1976 to 2020. It was usually held in February or March of each year. In 2011, it became part of the International Federation of Gymnastics (FIG) Artistic Gymnastics World Cup series. With the exception of 2005 (when the competition was also part of the FIG World Cup series), it has been exclusively an all-around competition. Past champions include Olympic all-around champions Nadia Comăneci, Mary Lou Retton, Vitaly Scherbo, Paul Hamm, Carly Patterson, Nastia Liukin, Gabby Douglas, and Simone Biles. The final American Cup took place on March 7, 2020, in Milwaukee.

Past women's medalists

Past men's medalists

Sponsorships
Since 1978, the American Cup has been sponsored by various companies, and the event is typically named for the sponsoring company. AT&T cancelled its sponsorship of the competition prior to the 2018 event due to the ongoing sex abuse scandal at USA Gymnastics.

Nastia Liukin Cup

Since 2010, the American Cup weekend has also seen the inclusion of an event open exclusively to Level 10 Junior Olympic female athletes, the Nastia Liukin Cup, named after Nastia Liukin.

See also
 U.S. Classic
 USA Gymnastics Championships

References

 
Artistic gymnastics competitions
International gymnastics competitions hosted by the United States
Gymnastics competitions in the United States
Artistic Gymnastics World Cup